The United States Armor Association is a non-profit organization with over 6,000 members dedicated to disseminating knowledge of the military art and sciences, with special attention to mobility in ground warfare.

History
The United States Armor Association, recently renamed "The Cavalry and Armor Association," grew out of the United States Cavalry Association, established by a small group of cavalry officers in 1885 at Fort Leavenworth, Kansas.

Membership
Membership in the United States Armor Association is open to anyone currently serving in the Air Force, Army, Navy, Marines, Coast Guard, or former members of these organizations and veterans. Members receive ARMOR, the professional journal of the Army's Armor and Cavalry branch, which began life as The Journal of the U.S. Cavalry Association, in 1888, published by cavalry officers serving on the American frontier.

Awards program
In 1986, the United States Armor Association began an Awards Program to honor the very best of America's tankers and troopers. The Saint George Award program provides the mounted force with a way to recognize outstanding performers, their spouses (Order of St. Joan D'Arc Medallion) and Armor Force supporters (Noble Patron of Armor Award).

References

External links

United States Army associations